The Last Blockbuster is a 2020 documentary film about Blockbuster LLC's last store, located in Bend, Oregon. It was released on December 15, 2020, by 1091 Pictures.

Synopsis
The documentary tells the story of the rise and fall of Blockbuster Video, a video rental business that was popular during the 1990s. The documentary explores how Blockbuster put independent video rental stores out of business by striking revenue-share deals with film studios (allowing Blockbuster to negotiate lower prices in exchange for a cut of the rental fees), and how Blockbuster itself collapsed as a result of poor management and the financial crisis of 2007–2008. The film also documents the business model and continued survival of the last remaining Blockbuster store, in Bend, Oregon.

Cast
The film follows Sandi Harding, the general manager of the last store over the course of a number of years. Actor and Clerks director Kevin Smith discusses the kind of businesses that Blockbuster put out of business and how they inspired his debut film. Other interviewees include Adam Brody, Samm Levine, Ron Funches, Paul Scheer, Doug Benson, James Arnold Taylor, Jamie Kennedy, and Brian Posehn.

Reception
The site's consensus reads, "Slight but entertaining, The Last Blockbuster doesn't add much to the saga of the fallen video rental store, but should satisfy nostalgic customers in the mood for a quick diversion." Metacritic gave it a score of 59, indicating "mixed or average reviews".

See also

 All Things Must Pass: The Rise and Fall of Tower Records, a 2015 documentary

References

External links

Official trailer
Excerpt

1091 Pictures films
2020s American films
2020 documentary films
2020s English-language films
2020 films
American documentary films
Blockbuster LLC
Documentary films about business
Films set in Oregon